Xu Fan (born 16 August 1967) is a Chinese actress and Asian Film Awards winner. She married film director Feng Xiaogang in 1999 and has starred in a number of films and television series directed by her husband.

Filmography

Films

Television

References

External links
 
 
 
 

1967 births
Living people
20th-century Chinese actresses
21st-century Chinese actresses
Chinese film actresses
Chinese television actresses
Actresses from Wuhan
Central Academy of Drama alumni
Best Actress Asian Film Award winners